Ovidiu Toniţa (born  August 6, 1980) is a Romanian former rugby union player who played 73 times for the  national team between 2000 and 2016. A former lock and presently a flanker and number 8. He played the majority of his career for USA Perpignan. He is noted for his size, which is considered unusual for his position on the field. His supporters are known to have compared him to the Australian footballer John Eales, and he is often seen as Romania's key player.

Career
Born in Bârlad, Toniţa worked as a soft drinks distributor for The Coca-Cola Company from age 15, and played rugby for local club Rulmentul Bârlad. He moved to France, where he played in the Top 14, originally for FC Grenoble (1999–2002), and later for Biarritz Olympique (2002–2004).

In 1999, at the age of 19, he made his international debut as a reserve for the Romania national team, being one of the youngest players at the 1999 Rugby World Cup. His test debut was against Morocco national team in 2000. He won his first 14 caps as a lock, and established himself as a flanker after moving to Perpignan.

He was included in Romania's squad at the 2003 Rugby World Cup. He was injured for three months in early 2005 and took part in the 2007 Rugby World Cup, where he was Romania's vice-captain. During the latter event, as Romania prepared to face the Scotland, Toniţa was deemed "perhaps (Romania's) one world-class player" in a Scotsman article. An analysis of the Romanian squad, published by The West Australian, noted that Toniţa "is a class act in the scrum", while arguing that, given Romania's poor results: "The sad thing for him is that he is playing with the wrong generation of players." He also competed at the 2011 and 2015 Rugby World Cups. In a testimony to both the length of his top-level career and his country's lack of World Cup success, Toniţa set a new record at the 2015 World Cup by participating in his 12th losing World Cup match, surpassing the previous record of 11 held by his countryman Romeo Gontineac and Namibian Hugo Horn.

Honours
Club
Grenoble
Pro D2
Runner-up: 2001–02

Perpignan
 Top 14
 Champion: 2009
 Runner-up: 2010

International
Romania
European Nations Cup: 2004–06

References

External links

 
 
 
 
 
 Ovidiu Tonița at Rugbyrama.fr 

1980 births
Living people
Biarritz Olympique players
FC Grenoble players
USA Perpignan players
Provence Rugby players
CSM București (rugby union) players
Romanian rugby union players
Romania international rugby union players
Rugby union flankers
Rugby union locks
Rugby union number eights
Sportspeople from Bârlad
Romanian expatriate rugby union players
Expatriate rugby union players in France
Romanian expatriate sportspeople in France
US Carcassonne players